Algi may refer to:

Algi, Barisal, Bangladesh
Algi, Chittagong, Bangladesh
Algi, Iran, in Khuzestan Province, Iran
Algi-ye Olya, in Chaharmahal and Bakhtiari Province, Iran
Algi-ye Sofla, in Chaharmahal and Bakhtiari Province, Iran